FC Schaffhausen is a Swiss football team from the town of Schaffhausen. The club plays in the Challenge League, the second tier of Swiss football.

Honours

League
Swiss Challenge League
Winners: 1962-63, 2003–04

Cup
Swiss Cup
Runners-up: 1987–88, 1993–94

Current squad

Former players
See .

Former coaches
 Husnija Arapović (1980–84)
 Rolf Fringer (1990–92)
 Jürgen Seeberger (2000–07)
 Peter Schädler (2007)
 Marco Schällibaum (2007–08)
 Fabian Müller (2008–09)
 René Weiler 2009–2011
 Martin Andermatt 2021–2022

References

 
Football clubs in Switzerland
Association football clubs established in 1896
Schaffhausen
1896 establishments in Switzerland